In January 1983, 13 tornadoes were reported in the United States, with two fatalities occurring in Louisiana and a total of $11.325 million (1983 USD) in damage being reported. In February 1983, 44 tornadoes were reported in the United States with one fatality occurring in Florida and a total of $17.833 million (1983 USD) in damage being reported.

January

January 29 event

January 31 event

February

February 1 event

February 2 event

February 5 event

February 9 event

February 10 event

February 22 event

February 27 event

See also 
 Tornadoes of 1983

Notes

References 

Tornadoes of 1983
1983 meteorology
1983-related lists